Grenzbach may refer to:

 Charles Grenzbach (1923–2004), American sound engineer
 Grenzbach (Darmühlenbach), a river of North Rhine-Westphalia, Germany